milc or variation, may refer to:

 mirrorless interchangeable lens camera (MILC)
 Metal-induced lateral crystallization (MILC)
 Milk Income Loss Contract (MILC)
 Minor League Cricket (MiLC)
 Manchester International Law Center (MILC), founded by Jean d'Aspremont and Iain Scobbie

See also

 
 Milk (disambiguation)